Loricariichthys brunneus, commonly called Alcalde , Paleta  or Tabla  is a species of catfish in the family Loricariidae. It is native to South America, where it occurs in the Orinoco basin in Guyana and Venezuela. The species is believed to be a facultative air-breather. A species of parasitic nematode in the family Guyanemidae, Guyanema longispiculum, was described in 1996 from the abdominal cavity of L. brunneus specimens.

References 

Loricariidae
Fish described in 1828
Catfish of South America
Fish of Guyana
Fish of Venezuela